Three Steps to the Gallows, released in the United States as White Fire, is a 1953 British crime film directed by John Gilling and starring Scott Brady, Mary Castle and Gabrielle Brune. The film, essentially a British second feature, is enhanced by the attractive American leads.

Premise
An American merchant ship officer on shore leave in London learns that his brother is about to be hanged in three days and sets out to prove his innocence against an organised smuggling gang based in a nightclub. His plight becomes increasingly tense in the face of double crosses and bad decisions in a race against time.

Partial cast
 Scott Brady - Gregor Stevens 
 Mary Castle - Yvonne Durante 
 Gabrielle Brune - Lorna Dryhurst 
 Ferdy Mayne - Mario Sartago 
 Colin Tapley - Arnold Winslow 
 John Blythe - Dave Leary 
 Michael Balfour - Carter 
 Lloyd Lamble - James Smith
 Julian Somers – John Durante 
 Ballard Berkeley - Inspector Haley 
 Ronan O'Casey - Crawson 
 Johnnie Schofield - Charley
 Paul Erickson - Larry Stevens 
 Hal Osmond - Desk clerk
 Ronald Leigh-Hunt - Captain Adams
 Dennis Chinnery - Bill

References

External links

1953 films
British crime films
1953 crime films
Films directed by John Gilling
Films shot in London
Films set in London
British black-and-white films
1950s English-language films
1950s British films